The Canton Hospital or Ophthalmic Hospital in Canton, also known as the Canton Pok Tsai Hospital, was founded by Protestant medical missionary Peter Parker (1804-1888) in Canton, China on November 4, 1835. The hospital treated thousands of patients in need, became the center for the Medical Missionary Society in China, and still exists today as one of the most prestigious ophthalmic institutes in the world.

Background Information

Canton 

Canton, now Guangzhou, was the center of foreign and international trade in China during the period of the late Qing dynasty. Canton was the only city in China where foreigners were allowed to set foot, thereby making it the only place where European and Chinese merchants could trade. Its location next to the Pearl River also made it ideal for international trade, as all ships used for trade were forced to travel along this river in order to arrive at the Port of Canton. Additionally, it was a major stop along the Silk Road, and is still a major port and city for transportation today. Canton was also surrounded by a major wall, which isolated it from the rest of the general population. Overall, because Canton was the only city in China that was open to foreign trade, medical mission work was made possible here and spread more easily.

Dr. Peter Parker
Peter Parker was an American Protestant medical missionary. Before travelling to China, he attended Yale University for postgraduate work in theology and medicine. However, his main goal in travelling to China was not to practice medicine; instead, it was to save the Chinese from idol-worshipping and introduce them to Protestantism and Christianity. He first began work in the hospital by treating diseases in the eye because he was told it would be the fastest way to gain the trust of the Chinese. Because many of the natives regarded all foreigners as barbarians, it was important for Parker to gain the natives' trust in order to perform medicine on them and introduce them to Christianity.

Eventually, Parker found so much joy in treating patients that he ultimately committed himself to becoming a full-time doctor, instead of a part-time evangelist and part-time doctor like he had originally planned. During his twenty years of work in China, Parker treated over 50,000 patients. In the later years of his life, he became a fervent promoter of medical missions and played an instrumental role in increasing their importance and popularity.

History of the Hospital
On November 4, 1835, Peter Parker opened the Canton Hospital, which was the first Western-style hospital in China. Parker, the first full-time Protestant medical missionary, opened the hospital in connection with the mission of the American Board after Dr. Thomas Richardson Colledge, a Christian surgeon of the East India Company, convinced existing Protestant mission societies of the need for a hospital in China. Colledge strongly believed that Christians were required to help the sick in China, and as a result, pushed Parker, his mentee, to open a hospital in Canton.

Under the support of the American Board and Canton businessmen, the hospital was the first and most famous charitable missionary hospital in South China at the time. When Parker opened the hospital, it was first only intended for the treatment of eye illnesses and was opened as an “Eye Infirmary.” This helped Parker gain trust with the Chinese, but it was also practical because of patients' needs at the time. In many areas, Chinese medicine was not extremely far behind western medicine, but because they were not as advanced in eye medicine, there was a high prevalence of eye diseases during this time. Throughout the first three months of the hospital being open, 1061 patients were treated, and 96.1% of those had ocular illnesses. The hospital quickly proved to be very successful, and after the first year, 2,910 patients were treated. Soon after the hospital opened, Parker was asked to treat ear illnesses in addition to eye illnesses. This led to him finding a number of patients with tumors, and he was forced to perform surgery on these patients, which were almost always successful. As soon as others heard of Parker’s success, patients with all different types of illnesses and diseases wanted to come to the hospital for treatment. As a result, Parker soon found it impractical for the hospital to only treat eye illnesses, and it then opened up to all different types of diseases.

Eventually, the hospital became so well known and in demand that it had to turn away patients because it became too much for only one physician. The hospital’s Chinese name, Pok Tsai, means Universal Helpfulness, which shows that everyone knew that the hospital would serve all classes in the community, Chinese and foreign. In order to stay open, Parker depended on support from missionary colleagues and local business firms and merchants (especially Chinese merchant How-Qua). Because he didn’t charge for his services, he relied on their money to stay open. In addition, this hospital also led to Western-style medical education in China, when Parker and Dr. E.C. Bridgman trained three young Chinese men to help out in the hospital. However, it was not until 1866 that the first western-style medical school, the Boji Medical School, was established in the hospital. This medical school was run by missionaries, and is now part of the Sun-yatsen University of Medical Sciences.

In 1840, the First Opium War led to hostilities between England and China. During the war, the port of Canton was blockaded and all foreigners were forced to leave, causing the Canton Hospital to be temporarily shut down. Near the end of the war, China was forced to accept treaties that required them to open their borders to foreigners. As a result, missionaries were now allowed to do work in all of China (not only in Canton like before the war). In 1842, Parker returned to Canton with his wife, Harriet Webster (who was the first Western woman to be granted residence in China), and reopened the hospital. It remained under the control of the Medical Missionary Society until 1930, when it became part of Lingnan University.

Functions of the Hospital
The hospital’s main goals included the diagnosis and treatment of diseases, the distribution of free vaccines, and plague treatments. Because the hospital was built by Parker in conjunction with other Protestant medical missionaries, philanthropic-minded physicians were very prominent at the hospital. As a result, it was also involved in areas outside of the treatment of diseases, including medical education, research, social service work, and promoting public health to the surrounding community. It cooperated with the Chinese government and many social organizations to develop school health, maternal and child health, and communicable disease control. The hospital was also built on a three-level medical system, which provided a model for the establishment of the Chinese rural medical system.

Legacy
The Canton Hospital is one of the most influential missionary hospitals in South China. Not only was it the first hospital that brought the concept of public health to the city of Canton, but it is also sustainable, as it still exists today as one of the most prestigious ophthalmic institutes in the world. Throughout its time open, the hospital set many records in Chinese medical history, including being the first western medicine school in China, and producing the first Chinese medicine magazine and the first x-ray film. It also produced the hospital's best student, Sun Yat Sen, who became the first president of China.
In addition, the Canton Hospital gave explicit expression to the concept of medical missions for the first time. In 1838, it led to the creation of the Medical Missionary Society in China, a Protestant medical missionary society established in Canton, which was dedicated to promoting religious missions and gaining the trust of the Chinese through medical care, instead of through preaching. In 1898, Parker’s successor, John Glasgow Kerr, founded The Asylum for the Insane in Canton, which was the first institution in China dedicated to the mentally ill. This was a direct result of the hospital’s success, and shows the impact that it had on public health and medicine in China.

Today it is the Second Affiliated Hospital of Sun Yat-sen University. It is a tertiary referral hospital.

See also 
 Mary Hannah Fulton, American physician at Canton Hospital in the 1890s
 John Glasgow Kerr, Second Superintendent of the Canton Hospital
 Mary West Niles, first female medical missionary physician and Superintendent Women's Ward
 William Warder Cadbury, Chief Physician(1917) and Superintendent(1930) of the Canton Hospital

References

External links 
 Trinity College (Connecticut)'s collection: Canton Hospital, Canton, China.

Buildings and structures in Guangzhou
Hospitals established in 1835
Hospitals in Guangdong
1835 establishments in China
Christian missions in China
Protestant missionaries in China
Medical missions